Xanthophyllum pulchrum is a plant in the family Polygalaceae. The specific epithet  is from the Latin meaning "beautiful", referring to the plant's appearance.

Description
The smooth bark is grey, brown or greenish. The flowers are pink or whitish, drying red or brownish orange.

Distribution and habitat
Xanthophyllum pulchrum grows naturally in Peninsular Malaysia and Borneo. Its habitat is mixed dipterocarp forests or swampy terrain from sea-level to  altitude.

References

pulchrum
Flora of Peninsular Malaysia
Flora of Borneo
Plants described in 1890